Matthew D. "Matt" Bostrom, DPA is a member of the law faculty at the Centre for Criminology at Oxford University England. From January 2011 to 2017 he served as the 21st Sheriff of Ramsey County, an urban county encompassing Saint Paul, and the state capital of Minnesota. Bostrom was elected Sheriff replacing four-term incumbent Bob Fletcher.<ref> Ramsey County Elections, Select county abstract 2010 state general elections, page 27, which has 93544 votes for Matt Bostrom, 69958 votes for Bob Fletcher with 628 write in votes.  The 14% difference is calculated by ((93544-69958)/(93544+69958+628))x100</ref  City Hall Scoop, Pioneer Press blog, September 25, 2009. Retrieved October 6, 2011.</ref> Fletcher was ultimately reelected to the position following Bostrom's departure.

Bostrom began his law enforcement career as a police officer in the Saint Paul Police Department in 1982. He rose through the ranks becoming Assistant Chief of Support Services before his election to Ramsey County Sheriff.

Bostrom holds a Doctor of Public Administration degree from Hamline University. He authored "The Influence of Education on Police Officer Work Habits" and co-authored "The United States Department of Justice: Character-Based Police Officer Selection". Concurrent with his law enforcement roles, Bostrom was an adjunct professor at Saint Mary's University of Minnesota, University of Northwestern (Minnesota), and Hamline University.

References

Living people
People from Saint Paul, Minnesota
Hamline University alumni
Minnesota sheriffs
Year of birth missing (living people)